Manuel António Pina ComIH (18 November 1943 – 19 October 2012) was a Portuguese journalist and writer.  In 2011 he was awarded the Prémio Camões, the most important literary award in the Portuguese language.

Pina was born in Sabugal, and died, aged 68, in Porto.

Awards
Camões Prize 2011

References

1943 births
2012 deaths
Portuguese journalists
Male journalists
Portuguese male writers
People from Sabugal
University of Coimbra alumni
Camões Prize winners